Philip Beaulieu (born September 2, 1995) is an American professional ice hockey defenseman currently playing for the Worcester Railers in the ECHL. He was an All-American for Northern Michigan.

Playing career
After graduating from East High School in 2014, Beaulieu played another two years at the junior level before he got the opportunity to play college hockey. In his freshman season with Northern Michigan both Beaulieu and the Wildcats were a bit flat but all that changed in the offseason. a new head coach, Grant Potulny, was brought in and the team's fortunes appeared to change overnight. NMU won nearly twice as many games and advanced in the postseason for the first time in eight years, reaching the WCHA championship game. Beaulieu, meanwhile, saw his offensive numbers balloon and he led the nation in scoring from the blueline. Beaulieu's offensive production declined the following year but it didn't stop him from being named team captain as a senior. Unfortunately, he was unable to get Northern Michigan to improve its record and the team was knocked out in the conference quarterfinals.

The start to Beaulieu's professional career was delayed due to the COVID-19 pandemic but he did finally receive a contract with the Allen Americans for the 20–21 season. He played well in his rookie year, averaging just over a point every other game and helped the Americans reach the ECHL semifinals. His performance was good enough for the team to bring him back for a second campaign.

On June 13, 2022, after two seasons with the Americans, Beaulieu was traded to the Worcester Railers, completing a previous future considerations trade.

Career statistics

Awards and honors

References

External links

1995 births
Living people
American men's ice hockey defensemen
AHCA Division I men's ice hockey All-Americans
Allen Americans players
Fargo Force players
Iowa Wild players
Madison Capitols players
Ice hockey people from Minnesota
People from Duluth, Minnesota
Northern Michigan Wildcats men's ice hockey players
Waterloo Black Hawks players
Worcester Railers players